Linda L. Horton is an America materials scientist and the director of the Office of Basic Energy Sciences (BES) at the United States Department of Energy. She is also acting in the role of director of the BES' Materials Sciences and Engineering Division.

Education 
Horton received her Ph.D. from the University of Virginia in Materials Science, and worked in the field of electron microscopy at Oak Ridge National Laboratory, where she became the Director for the Center for Nanophase Materials Sciences. She served on the Board of Directors for the Microscopy Society of America, the Materials Research Society, and ASM International.

References 

Living people
United States Department of Energy officials
Year of birth missing (living people)
Place of birth missing (living people)
University of Virginia School of Engineering and Applied Science alumni
Oak Ridge National Laboratory people
Women materials scientists and engineers
American materials scientists